WIAM (900 kHz) is a non-commercial AM radio station broadcasting a Christian radio format. Licensed to Williamston, North Carolina, it serves the Greenville radio market.  The station is owned by Lifeline Ministries and airs a Christian radio format, including religious instruction programs and Southern Gospel music.

History
In March 1951, WIAM first signed on the air.

References

External links

Southern Gospel radio stations in the United States
IAM